Tetrapleurodon is a genus of lampreys that are endemic to the Lerma–Chapala basin in west–central Mexico. Both species are threatened.

Species
There are two recognized species in this genus according to FishBase. They are sometimes included in the genus Lampetra instead.

 Tetrapleurodon geminis Álvarez, 1964 (Mexican brook lamprey)
 Tetrapleurodon spadiceus (T. H. Bean, 1887) (Mexican lamprey)

References

Petromyzontidae
Fish of North America
Jawless fish genera